Alexander Boyd McColl ["Red"] (March 29, 1894 – February 6, 1991) was a Major League Baseball pitcher who played for the Washington Senators in  and . McColl made his MLB debut at the age of 39, one of 8 pitchers in MLB history to debut at 39 or older. He played for 18 seasons in the minor leagues, never above Double-A, before making his major league debut. In his fifth career game, McColl recorded two perfect innings in Game 2 of the 1933 World Series.

References

External links

1894 births
1991 deaths
Major League Baseball pitchers
Washington Senators (1901–1960) players
Akron Tyrites players
Americus Cardinals players
Charlotte Hornets (baseball) players
Chattanooga Lookouts managers
Chattanooga Lookouts players
Cleveland Spiders players
Dallas Steers players
Greenville Spinners players
Jacksonville Tars players
Knoxville Smokies players
Minneapolis Millers (baseball) players
Memphis Chickasaws players
Mobile Bears players
Mobile Marines players
Nashville Vols players
Portsmouth Cobblers
St. Joseph Saints players
South Bend Benders players
Springfield Nationals players
Toledo Iron Men players
Warren Buckeyes players
Baseball players from Ohio
People from Ashtabula County, Ohio
Portsmouth Cobblers players